The Edict of Thessalonica (also known as Cunctos populos), issued on 27 February AD 380 by Theodosius I, made the Catholicism of Nicene Christians the state church of the Roman Empire. It condemned other Christian creeds such as Arianism as heresies of "foolish madmen," and authorized their punishment.

This edict, addressed to the inhabitants of Constantinople whom Theodosius wished to pacify in order to make the city his imperial residence, constitutes the first known secular law which includes in its preamble a clear definition of what a Christian Roman ruler considers as religious orthodoxy, opening the way of repression against dissidents qualified as "heretics". The Edict of Thessalonica was subsequently incorporated into Book XVI of the Theodosian Code and was the milestone of the official Christianization of the Roman Empire.

Background
In 313 the emperor Constantine I, together with his eastern counterpart Licinius, issued the Edict of Milan, which granted religious toleration and freedom for persecuted Christians. By 325 Arianism, a school of christology which contended that Christ did not possess the divine essence of the Father but was rather a primordial creation and an entity subordinate to God, had become sufficiently widespread and controversial in Early Christianity that Constantine called the Council of Nicaea in an attempt to end the controversy by establishing an empire-wide, i.e., "ecumenical" orthodoxy. The council produced the original text of the Nicene Creed, which rejected the Arian confession and upheld that Christ is "true God" and "of one essence with the Father."

However, the strife within the Church did not end with Nicaea, and the Nicene credal formulation remained contentious even among anti-Arian churchmen. Constantine, while urging tolerance, began to think that he had come down on the wrong side, and that the Nicenes—with their fervid, reciprocal persecution of Arians—were actually perpetuating strife within the Church. Constantine was not baptized until he was near death (337), choosing a bishop moderately sympathetic to Arius, Eusebius of Nicomedia, to perform the baptism.

Constantine's son and successor in the eastern empire, Constantius II was partial to the Arian party, and even exiled pro-Nicene bishops. Constantius' successor Julian (later called "The Apostate" by Christian writers) was the only emperor after the conversion of Constantine to reject Christianity, attempting to fragment the Church and erode its influence by encouraging a revival of religious diversity, calling himself a "Hellene" and supporting forms of Hellenistic religion. He championed the traditional religious cultus of Rome as well as Judaism, and furthermore declared toleration for all the various unorthodox Christian sects and schismatic movements. Julian's successor Jovian, a Christian, reigned for only eight months and never entered the city of Constantinople. He was succeeded in the east by Valens, an Arian.

By 379, when Valens was succeeded by Theodosius I, Arianism was widespread in the eastern half of the Empire, while the west had remained steadfastly Nicene. Theodosius, who had been born in Hispania, was himself a Nicene Christian and very devout. In August, his western counterpart Gratian promoted persecution of heretics in the west.

Content
The Edict of Thessalonica was jointly issued by Theodosius I, emperor of the East, Gratian, emperor of the West, and Gratian's junior co-ruler Valentinian II, on 27 February 380. The edict came after Theodosius had been baptized by the bishop Ascholius of Thessalonica upon suffering a severe illness in that city.

Importance

The edict was followed in 381 by the First Council of Constantinople, which affirmed the Nicene Symbolum and gave final form to the Nicene-Constantinopolitan Creed. 

The edict was issued under the influence of Ascholius, and thus of Pope Damasus I, who had appointed him. It re-affirmed a single expression of the Apostolic Faith as legitimate in the Roman Empire, "catholic" (that is, universal) and "orthodox" (that is, correct in teaching).

The Nicene Creed states: "We believe in one God, the Father Almighty ... And in one Lord Jesus Christ." It declares Jesus Christ be "consubstantial (homo-ousios) with the Father," which may be interpreted as numerical or as qualitative sameness (See Homoousion). The creed adds that we also believe in the Holy Spirit but does not say that the Holy Spirit is homo-ousios with the Father. The Edict of Thessalonica goes much further and declares "the Father, the Son and the Holy Spirit" to be "one deity ... in equal majesty and in a holy Trinity."

Enforcement of the Edict 

If Theodosius prescribed that the edict be read to the people of the capital, it did not seem to have received any immediate or concrete application in Constantinople to the point that one could wonder if it had ever been published insofar as there was no official method at the time allowing communication to the population. Moreover, the edict only describes vague sanctions against offenders, of a symbolic nature, evoking "divine condemnation" and "ignominy", without these threats being accompanied by any specific provision, not even that of chasing heretics from their places of worship. As such, the edict appears to have had no immediate effect. 

After a few campaigns against the barbarian troops, Theodosius returned in September 380 to Thessaloniki where he fell seriously ill to the point that people feared for his life. Healed, he was baptized by the local Nicene bishop Ascholius, probably around October, then he went to Constantinople to make his solemn entry on November 24. The implementation of the edict took place only when Theodosius joined the prestigious city which he needed to make his capital in order to consolidate his still fragile hold on the territories of Valens.

Barely two days after his arrival, faced with his refusal to publicly confess the creed of Nicea, Theodosius deposed the popular Acacian bishop of the city, Demophilus, whom he drove out of the walls of the city and replaced with Gregory of Nazianzus not without having had to rely on his troops to curb popular discontent. He then placed members of the Nicaean party—still a minority in Constantinople—in key positions in the clergy, entrusting them with all the churches in the capital and withdrawing their places of worship from the dissidents of Arian allegiance to whom he wasted no time in suppressing freedom of assembly. 

Radically settling the problems of the Church of Constantinople in this way, and probably advised in this direction by his Western entourage, Theodosius sought, rather than adherence to a profession of faith, to attach the loyalty of the Nicene clergy to his personality and his regime in order to maintain a certain stability in his capital, necessary to ensure an imperial residence there. He nevertheless tolerated Demophilus and his supporters continuing to practice their worship outside the city—probably more out of political prudence than out of a spirit of doctrinal tolerance—which the Acacian bishop continued to do for nearly twenty years without worrying. 

A few months later, on January 10, 381, Theodosius promulgates a rescript in Constantinople, addressed to the praetorian prefect of Illyricum Eutropius, whose provisions apply more harshly to heretics throughout the region—at least in its cities—echo the problems debated in the East and, referring this time explicitly to the Nicene creed, are much more drastic than those of the previous Theodosian edict: heretics—like the explicitly named Photinians, Arians and Eunomians—are to be expelled from the cities and their churches entrusted to elements who profess the Nicene faith.

After the edict in February 380, Theodosius spent a great deal of energy trying to suppress all non-Nicene forms of Christianity, especially Arianism, and in establishing Nicene orthodoxy throughout his realm:

In January of the following year (381), another edict forbade the heretics to settle in the cities.

In the same year, after the reformulation of the Nicene doctrine by the Council of Constantinople ... the procouncil of Asia was ordered to deliver all churches to these bishops 'who profess that the Father, Son and Holy Spirit are one majesty and virtue'.Richard Rubenstein, When Jesus Became God, 1999, p. 223

In 383, the Emperor ordered the various non-Nicene sects (Arians, Anomoeans, Macedonians, and Novatians) to submit written creeds to him, which he prayerfully reviewed and then burned, save for that of the Novatians, who also supported Nicene Christianity. The other sects lost the right to meet, ordain priests, or spread their beliefs.

The execution of Priscillian and his followers may be cited as typical of the treatment of heretics conditions in that time. In 384, Priscillian was condemned by the synod of Bordeaux, found guilty of magic in a secular court, and put to death by the sword with a number of his followers.

Theodosius forbade heretics to reside within Constantinople, and in 392 and 394 confiscated their places of worship.

See also
 Ancient Roman Christianity
 Christianization of the Roman Empire
 History of late ancient Christianity
 Persecution of pagans in the late Roman Empire

Notes

References

Bibliography 
 
 
 
 

380
380s in the Roman Empire
4th-century Christianity
Religion in the Byzantine Empire
Christianity in Roman Macedonia
Thessalonica
Religion and politics
Roman Thessalonica
Theodosius I